Carl Weintraub (born March 27, 1946) is an American actor who appeared on numerous television shows from the 1970s to the 2000s in addition to several films.

Weintraub had a starring role in Coins in the Fountain. He appeared in Beverly Hills Cop and Air Force One. He has also been featured in guest appearances Without a Trace, 8 Simple Rules, Judging Amy, ER, Days of Our Lives, Baywatch Nights, Cagney & Lacey, Trapper John, M.D., Remington Steele, Hill Street Blues, Barnaby Jones and Police Woman.

As a voice actor, Weintraub has appeared in Oliver & Company as the voice of DeSoto.

In 2013, he performed in Breadcrumbs Along the Trail, a solo performance. He is a founder of We Tell Stories, a theatre group.

Weintraub is also a partner in the Firefly Bistro in Pasadena, California.

Awards and honors
Weintraub is a recipient of the PASA Award (Professional Artists in Schools) for lifetime achievement.

Personal life
Weintraub is married to actress Laurie O'Brien.

Filmography

Film

Television

References

External links

1946 births
Living people
20th-century American male actors
21st-century American male actors
American male film actors
American male television actors
American male voice actors
Place of birth missing (living people)